The 2018–19 season is the 131st competitive association football season in India.

National teams

India national football team

2018 Intercontinental Cup

Final

2018 SAFF Championship

Group B

Semi-final

Final

2019 AFC Asian Cup

Group A

India national under-23 football team

2020 AFC U-23 Championship qualification
Group F

India men's national under-16 football team

2018 AFC U-16 Championship

Group C

Quarter-final

India women's national football team

2019 SAFF Women's Championship

Group B

Semi-final

Final

2020 AFC Olympic Qualifying Tournatment

First Round

Second Round
Though India won first two matches against Indonesia and Nepal and was able to draw against Myanmar but due to Myanmar's goal difference is greater than that of India's, India could not move to the third round of the qualification.

India women's national under-18 football team

2018 SAFF U-18 Women's Championship

Group A
Times listed are UTC+6

Semi-final

India women's national under-15 football team

2018 SAFF U-15 Women's Championship

Semi-final

Final

AFC competitions

2018 AFC Cup

Inter-zone play-off semi-finals

Altyn Asyr won 5–2 on aggregate.

2019 AFC Champions League

Preliminary round 2

|+West Region

2019 AFC Cup

|+South Asia Zone

Group E

Club competitions

Indian Super League

Results

Bracket

Semi-finals

|}

Final

I-League

Promotion and relegation
Teams promoted
 Real Kashmir
Teams relegated
 None

Results

Super Cup

I-League 2nd Division

Preliminary round

Group A

Group B

Group C

Final round

Indian Women's League

Group stage

Cluster I

Cluster II

Knock–out stage

References 

 
Football
Football
India
India
Seasons in Indian football